Masoalinae is a palm tree subtribe in the tribe Areceae.

References

External links 

Areceae
Arecaceae subtribes
Historically recognized angiosperm taxa